Lac-à-la-Tortue was a small town in the administrative region of Mauricie, in the province of Quebec, Canada. Founded in 1895, the town consisted of about 2500 inhabitants. Since January 1, 2002, Lac-à-la-Tortue has become one of the seven sectors of the new merged Shawinigan city. The Lac-à-la-Tortue area is located east of the Saint-Maurice River near the former town of Grand-Mère, east of the former city of Saint-Georges, south of Hérouxville and west of Saint-Narcisse.

Lac-à-la-Tortue sector takes its toponymic origin of the lake of the same name. Despite its proximity to the Saint-Maurice River (only three km at the closest), the lake is part of the Batiscanie watershed. The discharge of the lake flows north into the Rivière La Tortue (Turtle River), who joined the Rivière des Envies (Cravings River) in Saint-Stanislas. This lake is the oldest civil seaplane base in Canada and since the 20th century has been a well known resort.

Geography

Ecological reserve
Lac-à-la-Tortue sector has the largest peat lowlands of the St. Lawrence basin. This ecological reserve with a total area of 565.69 hectares is located approximately six kilometres south of Grand-Mère. This protected area is part of two municipal areas of Shawinigan: Lac-à-la-Tortue and Shawinigan-Sud. The ecological reserve protects a bog characteristic of the region lowlands of the St. Lawrence, west style.

This ecological reserve of Lac-à-la-Tortue is divided into two lobes. The eastern lobe extends over 11 kilometre north-south direction between Lac-à-la-Tortue and Troptôtchaud lake, while the western section extends from Lake Troptôtchaud until rang Saint-Mathieu to the northwest. The ecological reserve includes part of western lobe. This protected area attracts many nature observers.

Wetland on south-east

A sector of wetland covering three municipalities, is located south-east of Lac-à-la-Tortue, head of water between the watershed of Lac-à-la-Tortue (including the outlet of Lake Atocas), the rivière à la Tortue and Falls River:
 Row "Cote Saint-Pierre Coté Sud-Ouest", a few lands in southeast of Hérouxville and a dozen lands of Saint-Narcisse;
 Row "Cote Saint-Pierre Coté Northeast" in Saint-Narcisse, a few limited and isolated wetlands covering about 14 lots (near the road linking the 94th street of Lac-à-la-Tortue  and the 3rd row road of Saint-Narcisse);
 Row X 's in Hérouxville, some isolated areas at the southeast of the row, spread on eight lots;
 Row IX Lac-à-la-Tortue in Radnor Township, three lots (near the limit of Hérouxville);
 Forefront of Radnor in Saint-Narcisse, north-east of the row, is the head area of the Falls River.

History

First settlers 

Following the 1837-1838 revolts of patriots, Lord Durham advises the British government to establish a municipal structure in all parishes of the colony. Thus, there is proclamation of the municipality of the parish of Mount Carmel in 1859. The first settlers arrived in the territory of the municipality of Lac-à-la-Tortue in 1867. At the time, the territory is only a mission of the parish of Notre-Dame-du-Mont-Carmel, Quebec.

In December 1894, the parish was canonically erected. Gradually, the population of the mission increases to the total of 600 people in 1895. The detachment of the municipality of Notre-Dame-du-Mont-Carmel, Quebec is proclaimed as of March 30, 1895. April 29, 1895, the first municipal election was held. At the first meeting, on 6 May of the same year, councilors choose Onesimus L'Heureux as the first mayor of the municipality. It is important to note that the citizens of the municipality found that their name recently. In 1986, following a competition in schools organized by the Library and the City Council that the surnames "Tortulinois" and "Tortulinoise" were found.

Lake ownership 

Although water management in Canada is a provincial nature, Lac-à-la-Tortue is a rare exception in the country. The lake is owned by the city of Shawinigan since the merger in 2002 since the lake was owned by the former municipality of Lac-à-la-Tortue.

In the past, the first concession of Lac-à-la-Tortue was given as of January 10, 1879 to Mary Hall, wife of G.B. Hall, president of the company of the same name. The latter decided to sell it to the parish priest Caron of Saint-Maurice. In 1934, the body of water is sold to the Consolidated paper, which resells it as of November 27, 1943 at Canadian Pacific Air Lines (CPAL) for $1000. In 1920, the City Council took steps to acquire the lake to develop tourism. In 1967, after discussions with CPAL, an agreement is reached and the small municipality buys "his" lake for $1500. In 1970, the city council decided to seed muskellunge in the lake. Over time, these fish have become particularly large, but more rare.

Parish history 

The beginning of the religious history of the municipality is the 1880. At that time, the mission has not his own priest. The priest from the mother parish comes to celebrate mass on Sundays and feast days in the station. During one of his visits to the mission, Bishop Louis-François Richer Laflèche was surprised to find a small altar in the station. At that time, he said it was time to build a chapel. It was built in 1890 near the present church.

As of December 21, 1884, Louis-François Richer Laflèche sign the decree establishing the parish from a dismembered part of the parishes of Notre-Dame-du-Mont-Carmel, Quebec (Our Lady of Mount Carmel) and Saint-Jacques des Piles. The name chosen for the new parish is that of Saint-Théophile in honor of the first pastor was being made in the old mission, Théophile De Carufel, pastor of the mother church of the time.

The church 

The chapel was considered too small, as of January 20, 1898, a decree was issued by Bishop Lafleche who ordered that a church be built in the parish of Saint-Théophile. Construction began when the construction contract is awarded, on February 10, 1898, so that the whole is finished in time for the Christmas mass which was celebrated in the same year. As of October 12, 1898, the chapel was sold at auction, but it served the cult several months until the opening of the new church. During the demolition of the chapel, the tower was sold to a parishioner who used it as a smokehouse ham. Although today the church is brick, during its construction, the structure was built of wood. The walls were briquetted during renovations from 1930 to 1933 for the front and the rest of the church and sacristy in 1957.

The presbytery 

Since Bishop Lafleche had ordered the construction of the church, it was also decided to build a parsonage. It still stands in its original location, but had a somewhat different aspect. The building, like the church, was built of wood and had only one floor. The second floor was added during renovations in 1906. The brickwork was completed in 1963.

The convent and schools 

August 23, 1908 marks the arrival of the first nuns in the parish that was given the task to teach to the youth of the parish. At this time, the class was made in a house near the present Notre-Dame School. In 1915, the first convent was built on the site of the present school. The hotel quickly became overloaded, the construction of a college proved essential, it was made in 1960. The building is still visible today. Now, there is also the Jacques-Cartier school for 5e and 6e year.

Mine 

The history of the mine begins 20 years after the onset of the first forging Mauricie or in 1879. All deposits in the region had been exhausted. The industry was in crisis and on the verge of bankruptcy. Hope is reborn when ore was discovered on the banks and bottom of Turtle Lake. The largest ore deposits are found in the Bay of Maskinongé. At first, the extraction of iron was done with shovels in the shallow parts. To extract the ore in the deepest places, the company produces a Hall dredge operated with steam. The dredge could collect the ore to a depth of four meters.

Railway history 

The ore extracted from "Lac-à-la-Tortue" (Lake to the Turtle) was used to make various objects in the forges of the region, particularly in Forges du Saint-Maurice. The most important is the vast majority of the wheels of the transcontinental railroad that Prime Minister of Canada, John Alexander MacDonald had decreed the construction. The second use is the production of poles for use in the daily lives of people of the time. The exploitation of iron ore in the bottom of the lake ends in 1910 with the closure of the Company Foundries Ldt Canada, which operated the mine.

The railway in Lac-à-la-Tortue stood at the current location where there is the pipeline of Gaz Métropolitain buried. In 1990, a bike path is built on the soil over the pipeline.

The railway Lac-à-la-Tortue is an extension of the main railroad, which was built in 1879. Before its extension into the heart of the village in 1880, the iron ore extracted from the lake had to be transported by wheelbarrow to the railway which was existing before being transported to the Radnor Forges of Saint-Maurice, Quebec. In 1880, along with the advent of the railway in the parish, a small station was built.

With the closure of the iron mine in 1910, the company CP Air constantly ask permission to stop providing services to the station Lac-à-la-Tortue. Successive city councils then undertake a fight with the company to maintain the best possible services. In 1914, CP Air demand the closure of the station that is no longer profitable. It is rejected, but the company returned to the charge in 1921. The station master is replaced by a station agent. In 1928, the station is the last building in the village to be electrified. This was done after the city council had ordered the company. In 1948, the station agent was in turn replaced by a guard officer. The company continues in these approaches and tries to prove that the station is no longer profitable. 28 years after she decided to close the station without success, or in 1952, it continues to sell tickets and agent-guard is replaced by a single guard. In 1962, the station is destroyed. The railway is still in use for freight until 1980, where the rails are removed. The company Gaz Métropolitain installs its pipeline in 1983. Today, the land is owned by the city of Shawinigan.

Mayors

From 1895 to 2001, Lac-à-la-Tortue had its own mayor and its own city council.  The mayors were:

See also 

 Shawinigan
 Radnor Township, Quebec
 Lac-à-la-Tortue Airport
 Lac-à-la-Tortue Water Aerodrome
 Lac-à-la-Tortue Ecological Reserve

Footnotes

Neighbourhoods in Shawinigan
Former municipalities in Quebec
Former towns in Canada
Populated places disestablished in 2002